AAPS PharmSciTech is a bimonthly peer-reviewed scientific journal covering all aspects of the pharmaceutical sciences. The editor-in-chief is Robert O. Williams III (University of Texas at Austin). The journal was established in 2000 and is published by Springer Science+Business Media on behalf of the American Association of Pharmaceutical Scientists.

Abstracting and indexing
The journal is abstracted and indexed in:
Chemical Abstracts Service
CSA databases
Embase
Index Medicus/MEDLINE/PubMed
ProQuest databases
Science Citation Index Expanded
Scopus
According to the Journal Citation Reports, the journal has a 2021 impact factor of 4.026.

See also
 List of pharmaceutical sciences journals

References

External links

English-language journals
Pharmacology journals
Bimonthly journals
Springer Science+Business Media academic journals
Publications established in 2000